United Nations Security Council Resolution 1699, adopted unanimously on August 8, 2006, after recalling Resolution 1617 (2005) on co-operation between Interpol and the Committee established in Resolution 1267 (1999), the Council requested the Secretary-General to take steps to increase co-operation between the United Nations and Interpol.

Observations
The Council recalled the 1997 agreement between Interpol and the United Nations. It welcomed the role Interpol had played to assist the 1267 Committee in the fulfilment of its mandate, and recognised that this co-operation could benefit other sanctions committees established by the Security Council, including in the role of law enforcement.

Acts
The Secretary-General Kofi Annan was required to take "necessary steps" to increase co-operation between the United Nations and Interpol, in order for Security Council committees to fulfil their roles more effectively and to allow countries to better implement measures adopted by the Security Council.

Furthermore, states were encouraged to use tools offered by Interpol, including the I-24/7 worldwide police communications system, to reinforce measures approved the Security Council.

See also
 Interpol notice
 List of United Nations Security Council Resolutions 1601 to 1700 (2005–2006)

References

External links
 
Text of the Resolution at undocs.org
Interpol website

 1699
United Nations Security Council sanctions regimes
Interpol
August 2006 events